The 2012 West Coast Conference women's basketball tournament was held February 29 though March 5 at the Orleans Arena in the Las Vegas area community of Paradise, Nevada.

Format
With the addition of BYU to the conference, a new format will be introduced for the 2012 tournament.  The tournament will now start on Wednesday instead of Friday, and a first round 8 vs. 9 game has been added. The winner of the 8/9 game will play the 5 seed on Day 2 of the Tournament (Thursday) as well as the 6 vs. 7 match. BYUtv Sports will broadcast all the games from the second round through the semifinals. Day 3, or the Quarterfinals (Friday), will feature the winner of the 5/8/9 game playing the 4 seed and the winner of the 6/7 game playing the 3 seed. The semifinals (Saturday) will feature the appearance of the top 2 seeds. All teams will be off on Sunday, and the championship game will be played Monday afternoon on ESPNU.

Seeds

Schedule
All games on TV were streamed live online on ESPN3 and on Facebook.com. ESPN Full Court broadcast all the BYUtv games except for the first semi-final. All BYUtv games were also streamed online at www.byutvsports.com/gameday.

Bracket and scores

* Denotes Overtime Game

Game Summaries

All tournament conference team

See also
2011-12 NCAA Division I Women's basketball season
West Coast Conference men's basketball tournament
2012 West Coast Conference men's basketball tournament
2011–12 West Coast Conference women's basketball season
West Coast Conference women's basketball tournament

References

External links
 2012 ZAPPOS.COM WEST COAST CONFERENCE BASKETBALL CHAMPIONSHIPS

West Coast Conference women's basketball tournament
Tournament
West Coast Conference women's basketball tournament
West Coast Conference women's basketball tournament
West Coast Conference women's basketball tournament
Basketball competitions in the Las Vegas Valley
College basketball tournaments in Nevada
Women's sports in Nevada
College sports tournaments in Nevada